Ulva burmanica is a species of seaweed in Ulvaceae family that can be found in Pegu, Burma.

References

Ulvaceae
Plants described in 1889
Endemic flora of Myanmar